Allal El Hajjam (born 22 December 1949) is a poet and professor of Arabic language in the School of Humanities and Social Sciences at Al Akhawayn University in Ifrane, Morocco. Previously he taught at the School of Arts and Humanities in Meknès. He also taught at the Centers for Teacher Training at Errachidia, Rabat, and Meknès.

El Hajjam earned his Doctorat d’état at the School of Arts and Humanities in Meknès, and his D.E.S and D.E.A in the School of Arts and Humanities in Rabat. In addition, he was a visiting professor at George Washington University in Washington D.C. in 2004, and he has taught a number of summer programs. In 2001 he participated in an ACTFL Oral Proficiency Interview (OPI) Tester Training Workshop at Middlebury College. He is currently a visiting professor of Arabic at Emory University.

El Hajjam's publications include his collection of poems, At Lover Hour at Night (2001) and The Squirrel of Echota, and Mohamed Serghini: Modernization of the Contemporary Moroccan Poetry (2000).

He is Senior Arabic Lecturer at Emory University's Middle Eastern and South Asian Studies department since September 2012.

References

20th-century Moroccan poets
1948 births
Living people
Academic staff of Al Akhawayn University
21st-century Moroccan poets
Emory University faculty